"Shallow" is a song performed by American singer Lady Gaga and American actor and filmmaker Bradley Cooper. It was released through Interscope Records on September 27, 2018, as the lead single from the soundtrack to the 2018 musical romantic drama film A Star Is Born. "Shallow" was written by Gaga with Andrew Wyatt, Anthony Rossomando and Mark Ronson, and produced by Gaga with Benjamin Rice. The song is heard three times in the film, most prominently during a sequence when Cooper's character Jackson Maine invites Gaga's character Ally to perform it onstage with him. The scene was filmed in front of a live audience at the Greek Theater in Los Angeles.

"Shallow" is a pivotal moment in A Star Is Born, since it speaks about Ally and Jackson's conversations. Gaga wrote it from Ally's point of view with the self-aware lyrics asking each other if they are content being who they are. It is a power ballad that blends rock, country and folk-pop, finding Gaga and Cooper trading verses and gradually moves towards the climactic final chorus with a vocal run by Gaga. The recording is interspersed with the sound of audience noise and applause. Gaga premiered it on DJ Zane Lowe's Beats 1 radio show while giving an interview about the film. An accompanying music video was also released, showing both Gaga's and Cooper's characters singing "Shallow" together onstage, interspersed with scenes from A Star Is Born.

"Shallow" received universal acclaim from music critics, who commended Gaga's vocals, the dramatic nature of the composition and the songwriting. Commercially, the song topped the charts in more than twenty countries, including the United States and United Kingdom, and reached the top ten elsewhere. It received numerous accolades, including the Academy Award for Best Original Song, the Golden Globe Award for Best Original Song, the BAFTA Award for Best Film Music and the Critics' Choice Movie Award for Best Song. It garnered four Grammy Award nominations, including Record of the Year and Song of the Year while winning for Best Pop Duo/Group Performance and Best Song Written for Visual Media. It is one of the most streamed songs on Spotify and one of the world's best selling singles of all time. Gaga has performed "Shallow" live at her concerts and award ceremonies, including the 91st Academy Awards, where Cooper accompanied her.

Background and release

Gaga collaborated with Mark Ronson, with whom she had produced her fifth studio album, Joanne (2016), to develop the soundtrack for this version of the film A Star Is Born. Joanne contains country rock tracks and "twangier" ballads like "Million Reasons" and the title track, which influenced the songs in A Star Is Born. In the film, after meeting Gaga's character Ally, Bradley Cooper's character Jackson Maine talks to her about their music and dreams. Ally confesses she has written a song and sings it briefly for Jackson. Its lyrics become the basis of "Shallow", the full version of which is used in a sequence when Jackson strides onto the stage at the Greek Theater in Los Angeles and sings the opening verses. He had invited Ally to come to his show and told her he would be debuting the song and had rearranged it to sing at the concert.

Before the second verse Ally musters up the courage to go onstage to sing "Shallow", including belting the loud chorus to the large audience. Their performance goes viral and launches her music career. The track becomes a staple of her concerts. The song is used briefly for a third time when she sings it at The Forum. To film the "Shallow" sequence, Cooper filled the Greek Theater with around 2,000 Gaga fans and then recorded the song. Following the filming, Gaga entertained the crowd playing piano versions of her old songs; Lukas Nelson and Promise of the Real also sang at the venue.

"Shallow" was first heard during a teaser trailer for A Star Is Born in June 2018, where it appeared around the 1:46 mark with Gaga starting to belt the final chorus. The sequence was immediately made into many Internet memes. One week before the film's release, Interscope confirmed that "Shallow" would be released as the first single from the soundtrack on September 27, 2018. Gaga premiered it on Zane Lowe's Beats 1 radio show while being interviewed about the film. An accompanying music video was released showing Gaga and Cooper singing "Shallow" onstage, interspersed with scenes from A Star Is Born. The song was released as a digital download to the iTunes Store, YouTube and Spotify. BBC Radio 2 playlisted the track on October 13, 2018. In the United States, "Shallow" was sent to hot adult contemporary radio on October 15, 2018, and the next day it was added to contemporary hit radio panels.

Writing and recording

"Shallow" was among the first songs written by Gaga, Ronson, Dirty Pretty Things' Anthony Rossomando and Miike Snow's Andrew Wyatt. She had played the melody to her collaborators two years earlier in a recording studio in Malibu. When Lukas Nelson came on board during the soundtrack's development, the track's sound evolved. Nelson used his own band, Promise of the Real, as Jackson's band. Inspired by Eric Clapton, he added a short acoustic guitar intro at the beginning of "Shallow", feeling it would contrast with Gaga's loud belting which follows later in the song. Gaga went to EastWest Studios to help Nelson with the track and direct the band. He recalled that with some of the instrumentation, like the cymbal crashes, they "did that live in the studio based on the vision that we had". As well as producing the track with Gaga, Benjamin Rice recorded it at EastWest and The Village West studios in Los Angeles, assisted by Bo Bodnar and Alex Williams. Tom Elmhirst mixed the song at Electric Lady Studios in New York City. It was engineered by Brandon Bost and mastered by Randy Merrill at Sterling Sound Studios. Ronson also re-recorded a 1980s version of "Shallow", accompanied by big drums; it was used in the film during a sequence when Ally plays at The Forum, while Jackson kills himself.

Gaga described "Shallow" as a pivotal moment in A Star Is Born, since it spoke about Ally and Jackson's conversations and their "need and drive" to go deep and move away from the shallow area in their relationship, an interpretation recognized by critics. The singer explained on Beats 1 they wrote the track from the point of view of Ally and how it became part of the reason they fall in love. "When I was writing music for the film I had to think about Ally as if she wasn't me. I went with a sound for her, even in the pop realm, that's unlike anything I've ever put out before," she clarified. The songwriting sessions included Gaga at the piano and Ronson, Wyatt and Rossomando on guitar as they tried to come up with the verses. Ronson explained the original draft of the script had Jackson dying by drowning, which led Gaga to write the lyrics, "I'm off the deep end watch as I dive in". Initially, "Shallow" was an end credits song, but when the script changed it became a love song about Jackson and Ally. Seeing the first trailer for the film, Ronson decided not to refine the track anymore and kept it as the final mix. For Gaga, the conversational nature of the lyrics helped to set up Shallow's aria, which she recorded with a falsetto voice. She also came up with the play on the song title "Shallow", "In the sha-ha, sha-ha-ha-low" lyrics.

Composition and lyrical interpretation

A slow-burning rock, folk-pop and country power ballad, "Shallow" features mainly Nelson's acoustic guitar with Cooper and Gaga trading verses. The other musicians include Jesse Siebenberg on the lap steel guitar; Anthony Logerfo on drums; Corey McCormick on bass; Alberto Bof on keyboards; and Eduardo 'Tato' Melgar performing percussion. The recording is interspersed with the sound of audience noise and applause. The song is set in the time signature of common time and is composed in the key of G major with a moderate tempo of 96 beats per minute. It follows a chord progression of Em–D/F–G–C–G–D, with Gaga's vocal range spanning from the low note of G3 to the high note of D5.

Cooper opens the first verse by singing "Tell me something, girl" in a restrained voice; Gaga joins from the second verse, belting with what is described by Pitchfork as a "sturdy voice". As the song moves gradually towards the final chorus the final vocal run has been described by Jon Blistein of Rolling Stone as "chilling" with "impressive harmonizing" from both artists, accompanied by drum machine and pedal steel guitar. Gaga sings a "roaring" vocal, harmonizing on the run "Haaa-ah-ah-ah, haaawaah, ha-ah-ah-aaah". This ends by moving into the final chorus as she sings the lines: "I'm off the deep end / Watch as I dive in / I'll never meet the ground / Crash through the surface / Where they can't hurt us / We're far from the shallow now".

An article in The Guardian, notes that "Shallow" depicts the protagonists' self-realization of their current situation and speaks "for those, to whom life has not always been fair or kind". For Gaga, it's the connection and the dialogue established between Jackson and Ally, which made "Shallow" impactful. Ronson believed that working with Gaga on Joanne allowed the singer to delve into a more personal songwriting with "Shallow". The lyrics have both characters asking each other if they are satisfied being who they are. They demonstrate self-awareness, portraying "the gains and pains of stardom", and those of addiction in the lines, "In all the good times, I find myself longing for change, And in the bad times, I fear myself". The songwriters claim the drowning metaphor in the lyrics could be literal as well as about heartache, addiction or dreams shattering.

Copyright claim
Singer-songwriter Steven Ronsen claimed that the hook of "Shallow" is based on the same three-note progression sequence - G, A, B - from his track "Almost" (2012). Ronsen and his lawyer Mark D. Shirian are asking for millions of dollars in a settlement. Gaga has hired lawyer Orin Snyder, who said "Mr Ronsen and his lawyer are trying to make easy money off the back of a successful artist. It is shameful and wrong." He added, "Should Mr. Shirian proceed with this case, Lady Gaga will fight it vigorously and will prevail."

Critical reception
"Shallow" received widespread critical acclaim. Nicole Engelman of Billboard described the song as a strong ballad and a "stunning duet" featuring "striking harmony" between Gaga and Cooper. Carrie Wittmer of Business Insider and Papers Katherine Gillespie compared Cooper's vocals to those of singer-songwriter Eddie Vedder. Wittmer felt they complemented Gaga's "empowering and distinct voice". Several critics felt that "Shallow" was worthy of a nomination for the Academy Award for Best Original Song. Pitchforks Eve Barlow commended Gaga's performance, noting the theme "may prove to be Gaga's own apex in the spotlight, her completion into superstar of charts and screen". She wrote that although Cooper did not have "the deep growl of Kris Kristofferson (who played the lead male character in the 1976 film) [he] pulls off the earnestness required to hand over [to Gaga]".

Ben Beaumont-Thomas of The Guardian noted how "moments before she makes the octave jump for the big chorus, [Gaga's] face flickers with terror", adding the track is "torrid yet robust, and truly outstanding". Jenny Stevens, also a Guardian reviewer, complimented the lyrics for portraying the "inevitable comedown, the isolation and the untethered moments on the road when addiction can trample over a psyche". Stevens compared Gaga's vocals to those in Fleetwood Mac songs for their "raw, guttural, powerful" delivery and the ill-fated romance it heralds. Spins Maggie Serota felt Cooper was convincing "as a grizzled, whiskey-throated troubadour", and that the ballad "gives Lady Gaga a chance to show off her impressive pipes". Maeve McDermott of the Chicago Sun-Times praised "Shallow" for elevating A Star Is Born "from normal blockbuster fare to a masterwork of the form". She feels the "rapturous reception of [the track] was the most universally excited reaction to any Lady Gaga song in recent memory".

Jon Pareles of The New York Times rated it the "most boffo track" from the album and complimented its "exponential buildup" and Gaga's "throaty and breathy to full-scale belting". He felt "Shallow" was an immediate sequel to Gaga's "Million Reasons", but contained characteristic stuttered repeated syllables in the chorus, like her earlier songs, "Poker Face" and "Paparazzi" (both 2009). In another review, Jon Caramanica, from the same newspaper, described the song as a "good, old-fashioned, sound-of-the-1970s, gumption-of-the-1980s, high-treacle-higher-pomp roots ballad", writing that Gaga's vocal "throbs intensely here, leaning deep into the natural husk of her voice". NPR's Lars Gotrich felt "Shallow" is a "quiet, reflective country croon", describing Cooper as having "a sweet and amiable set of pipes" while Gaga as a "theater kid [...] roar[s] in at the chorus... growling the last word as if every rejection, every ex, every barrier embodies it. Beyond the shallow end of life, they embrace the deep."

Writing in Esquire magazine, Matt Miller was initially ambivalent towards the song, feeling it was just "two hooks from the trailer stitched into one song" and had a "meh" response to it. However, after watching the film he changed his opinion, saying "it mostly lives up to expectations—specifically, the first part of the movie and the build-up to when you first hear [it being performed]".  In an article published by Spotify analyzing "Shallow"s importance, the writer describes it as the film's "hero song", the first to "truly cover the topic" of the "dangers of Hollywood, fame, and stardom" themes prevalent in A Star Is Born.

Legacy
From its release, "Shallow" received universal acclaim and is considered among the best songs from any movie soundtrack of all time by many critics. "Shallow" was also seen by many commentators as assertion of Gaga's status in the entertainment industry. An article from Billboard regarding the 100 best musical bridges of the 21st century featured "Shallow" at number six, stating "the Oscar and Grammy winner starts off as a sweet, yet somber back and forth between a boy and a girl. But the guttural bridge launches "Shallow" off the deep end and into iconic territory. In the film, it's the precise moment that Ally's star is born. In the real world, it further cemented Gaga's legacy."

As for the song's impact on society, in an interview with Elle, Gaga states that "I really believe in my heart that the unfortunate truth is that our cell phones are becoming reality", she said. "It's become reality for the world. And in this song we provide not just a conversation, but also a very poignant statement. I wish not to be in the shallow, but I am. I wish to dive off the deep end, but watch me do it. I think this is something that speaks to many people, and during, I think, a very shallow time, it's a chance for us all to grab hands and dive into the water together and swim into the deepest depths of the water that we can."

Chart performance
On the second week after its debut, "Shallow" topped the Digital Songs chart, selling 58,000 copies (Gaga's sixth chart-topper), and entered the Billboard Hot 100 at number 28. Following the film's release on October 5, 2018, "Shallow" rose to number five on the Hot 100 and ran for a total of 45 weeks on that chart. It also topped the Digital Songs chart for a second consecutive week, selling 71,000 copies. The song marked Gaga's fifteenth top-ten entry on the chart and Cooper's first; it became Gaga's first Top Ten since 2017 with her track "Million Reasons". Shortly after the film's Academy Awards nominations, the track moved back into the top-twenty on the Hot 100, with sales increasing by 50%. One week after the Academy Awards, the song surged to the top of the Hot 100, becoming Gaga's fourth number-one single and Cooper's first, and returned to the top of the Digital Songs chart, selling 115,000 copies. It entered the Streaming Songs chart top-ten for the first time, with 27.3 million streams. The track became Gaga's longest running Digital Songs chart topper with ten weeks in the peak position, as well as longest-running number-one song by a female lead singer.

"Shallow" was streamed 148.6 million times in the US by January 2019 and was certified quadruple platinum by the Recording Industry Association of America (RIAA) for four million units. As of November 2019, it has sold 1,287,000 copies in the US. The song accumulated 23.3 million audience impressions debuting at number 50 on the Radio Songs chart and gradually climbed to number 10, attaining an audience of 57.4 million. It became Gaga's eighth top 10 on the Adult Pop Songs airplay chart (number two peak) becoming her fastest flight to the tier, topping the five-week climb of "Born This Way" and reached number two on the Adult Contemporary chart. "Shallow" topped the Dance Club Songs chart on December 15, 2018, aided by remixes from DJ Aron, Nesco and Lodato, among many others. It became Gaga's 15th leader on the tally, ranking her among artists with the most chart toppers.

In Canada, "Shallow" entered the Digital Songs chart at number one, becoming Gaga's fifth leader and first since "Born This Way". The song debuted at number 16 on the Canadian Hot 100. It reached the top of the charts in March 2019, becoming Gaga's fifth number-one single and Cooper's first. On the Digital charts the track remained in the pole position for 24 non-consecutive weeks, surpassing Ed Sheeran's "Perfect" (2017) as the longest-running song atop the chart at the time. In Australia, "Shallow" debuted at number 25 on the ARIA Singles Chart, before reaching number one two weeks later. It became Gaga's fourth song to reach the top, her first since "Born This Way", and Cooper's first. The track was the best-selling digital download for the week. It also reached the top of the radio airplay charts according to The Music Network. "Shallow" has since held the summit for five non-consecutive weeks. It has been certified thirteen times platinum by the Australian Recording Industry Association (ARIA). The song debuted at number 18 in New Zealand. By its second week it had climbed to number two. After two weeks, it topped the charts, becoming Gaga's third number-one song in the country.

The song entered the UK Singles Chart at number 13 with 20,425 units sold according to the Official Charts Company, and reached number six the following week. It sold another 36,952 units, becoming Gaga's 12th top-ten song in the nation. The track climbed to number four in the third week, selling 42,548 copies. It also reached the top-ten on the UK Airplay Charts, vaulting from number 62 to number eight, with total audience impressions of 48.83 million. For the week ending November 1, 2018, "Shallow" reached the top of the UK Singles Chart for two weeks becoming her fifth number one (her first since "Telephone" in 2010) and Cooper's first. The same week, A Star Is Born also returned to the top of the UK Albums Chart, giving Gaga and Cooper an Official UK Chart double, this being Gaga's third. After Gaga and Cooper's performance of the song at the 91st Academy Awards ceremony, it rose ten places to number 11 from number 21 on the UK Singles Chart for the week ending March 1, 2019. The British Phonographic Industry (BPI) awarded a quadruple platinum certification to the track for accumulating 2,400,000 equivalent sales units in the UK and by July 2022 the song has sold a total of 2,600,000 equivalent sales in the country with a total of 336 million streams.

Elsewhere, "Shallow" topped the charts in Ireland, Gaga's sixth number-one and Cooper's first. The song continued to top the charts and attained its highest weekly sales and streams in its third week. "Shallow" was the top-selling digital download in France for the week ending October 19, 2018, reaching number 13 on the Syndicat National de l'Édition Phonographique (SNEP) Singles Chart. After two weeks, the song reached number six on the chart. SNEP awarded "Shallow" a Diamond certification for accumulating 333,333 equivalent sales units.

In 2019 alone, the song sold 10.2 million copies worldwide (excluding the 2018 sales), according to the annual IFPI Reports. This makes Gaga the first woman ever to score four singles that have sold at least 10 million copies each globally (after "Just Dance", "Poker Face", and "Bad Romance").

Accolades

"Shallow" was nominated and won in the category of Best Original Song – Feature Film, at the 2018 Hollywood Music in Media Awards. It also won in the category of Best Original Song at the 23rd Satellite Awards, and won in the Los Angeles Online Film Critics Society. It won the award for Best Song at the Critics' Choice Movie Awards and Best Original Song at the 76th Golden Globe Awards. At the 61st Annual Grammy Awards, the song won Best Pop Duo/Group Performance and Best Song Written for Visual Media while nominated for Record of the Year and Song of the Year. "Shallow" also won the BAFTA Award for Best Film Music at the 72nd BAFTA Awards and the Best Original Song at the 91st Academy Awards. As a result, Gaga became the first woman in history to win an Academy Award, a BAFTA Award, a Grammy Award and a Golden Globe Award in the same year.

"Shallow" is widely considered to be both one of the best songs of the 2010s decade and one of the best movie tracks of all time. Both Jon Pareles and Jon Caramanica of The New York Times ranked "Shallow" as the sixth best song of 2018. Pareles called it a "perfectly calibrated power ballad" which achieved "movie-musical triple duty as love song, vocal showcase and plot pivot". Rolling Stone listed it as the second-best song of 2018 and the 14th-best song of the 2010s; their writer, Brittany Spanos, called it a "classic-rock fantasy where the 1990s never ended".

Live performances

91st Academy Awards

Gaga and Cooper performed "Shallow" together at the 91st Academy Awards on February 24, 2019. Cooper had confirmed that he would be singing in his own voice and not emulating that of his character in the film. The performance began with Gaga and Cooper walking up to the stage. They sat on opposite sides of a piano, with Cooper joining Gaga at the keyboard for the final part of the song, as both sang into one microphone. Rob Mills, senior vice president of the American Broadcasting Company, said the choreography, the camera placed facing the audience, and Cooper moving across towards Gaga during the last chorus were the duo's ideas. Aly Semigran from Billboard called it the best musical performance of the ceremony, saying that "their chemistry on stage was just as electric as it was on the big screen". She added that "The stars' sultry looks at one another [while] sitting at the piano launched a thousand 'OMG's on Twitter. A perfect Oscar performance was born."

Other performances

"Shallow" has been included in several of Gaga's other live performances. It debuted at her Las Vegas residency show, Enigma (2018–2020), where she performed the song on the piano as the encore, while wearing an oversized shirt of her own merchandise. On January 26, 2019, Cooper joined her onstage, marking the first time the duo had performed the song together live. At the 61st Annual Grammy Awards on February 10, 2019, Gaga was joined onstage by Ronson, Rossomando and Wyatt, while Cooper was attending the 72nd British Academy Film Awards in London. Gaga wore a sparkling skin-tight bodysuit and high platform shoes, described as reminiscent of her looks from her The Fame-era. She also carried a bedazzled microphone stand. Brittany Spanos from Rolling Stone thought that Gaga and Ronson "stole the Grammy Awards show with a rocked-up performance" of "Shallow". She compared Gaga's movements on the stage to a "Ziggy Stardust-era David Bowie". According to Billboard Tatiana Cirisano, the singer gave a "rollicking performance" of the song as she "held her own, kicking and hair-flipping her way across the stage". The performance generated a number of memes due to Gaga's continuous eye-contact with the recording camera onstage.

On November 2, 2020, Gaga performed "Shallow" along with "You and I" at president-elect Joe Biden's final campaign rally in Pittsburgh, Pennsylvania. In 2022, she performed "Shallow" at The Chromatica Ball stadium tour wearing a "praying mantis"-like headpiece, while playing on a piano which was set inside a sculpture of thorns. Jed  Gottlieb of the Boston Herald opined that Gaga "delivered all the tenderness 'Shallow' demands" on the tour, while Adam Davidson of Clash found it a "spine-tingling rendition".

Cover versions

American singers Lea Michele and Darren Criss added the song to the setlist of their LM/DC Tour on October 26, 2018, in Las Vegas. On November 14, 2018, Scottish singer Lewis Capaldi performed a cover of "Shallow" live on BBC Radio 1's Live Lounge. His rendition was later included on his 2020 EP, To Tell the Truth I Can't Believe We Got This Far. Actor Billy Porter covered the song during the pre-Golden Globe Awards party on January 4, 2019, at The Sunset House in West Hollywood, California. Alicia Keys performed "Shallow" on piano on The Late Late Show with James Corden on February 6, 2019, along with the host, James Corden. They tweaked the lyrics so that it reflected Keys' role as host of the 61st Annual Grammy Awards. When Corden sang "Tell me something, Keys, I hear you're set to host this year's Grammys", Keys responded, "Didn't you host it twice? Maybe you could give me some advice".

Comedian Melissa Villaseñor covered the song as part of her impersonation of Gaga during the "Weekend Update" segment of Saturday Night Live that aired on February 9, 2019. Villaseñor's belting was described as a "thrilling live moment" by Ryan McGee from Rolling Stone. The comedian reprised the role for following week's episode, which aired on February 16, 2019, singing the high notes from "Shallow". In February 2019, Kelly Clarkson covered the song at the Green Bay stop of her Meaning of Life Tour, while Nick Jonas posted a video on his Instagram account in which he played the guitar while singing the track. On February 28, 2019, Tori Kelly and Ally Brooke performed the song together at the Orpheum Theatre in Los Angeles during Kelly's headlining concert.

A video of Irish duo Jessica Reinl and Christopher Halligan, members of the Mount Sion Choir in Waterford, singing "Shallow" in December 2018 went viral and was seen by millions on Facebook. They were subsequently invited to perform the song on Irish national television. American indie rock duo Better Oblivion Community Center, composed of musicians Conor Oberst and Phoebe Bridgers, covered the song during a performance at the Brooklyn Steel venue on April 1, 2019. In May 2019, Brazilian singers Paula Fernandes and Luan Santana released a Portuguese version of "Shallow", titled "Juntos" ("Together"). The release of the new rendition caused a slight uproar in Brazil. On July 23, 2019, Mexican singer Ángela Aguilar released a cover version as part of the Recording Academy's Grammy ReImagines video series. Aguilar performed the song while playing the piano.

On February 16, 2020, a video starring Charlotte Awbery, an at-the-time unknown London commuter, became an overnight viral sensation gathering millions of views over social media. It depicts Awbery delivering a cover of "Shallow" during a spontaneous singing challenge by internet blogger Kevin Freshwater during a game in which he asks strangers to finish off the lyrics to different songs. On Instagram, Awbery gained 217,000 followers within a week of the video circulating. In the same week after the video went viral, the single off the A Star Is Born soundtrack version from Gaga & Cooper reportedly reentered the Top 40 on iTunes in the United States, landing at the number 30 spot. On February 26, 2020, Awbery appeared in The Ellen DeGeneres Show and performed her rendition of the song. On August 28, 2020, she released an official cover version as her debut single.

In April 2020, Carina Dahl and Åge Sten Nilsen released a cover version in Norwegian, called "Shallow (Så Ekte Nå)" ("So Real Now"), which received attention and popularity in Norway. The single was certified Gold by IFPI Norway in 2021. In October 2020, country music singers Garth Brooks and Trisha Yearwood, who are husband and wife, released a version of "Shallow". The duo released the version digitally in February 2021 and soon afterwards it was also serviced to country radio. A French version of the song is featured in the third season of Netflix's Emily in Paris (2022), sung by Ashley Park and Kevin Dias.

Credits and personnel
Credits adapted from the liner notes of A Star Is Born.

Management
 Published by Sony/ATV Songs LLC / SG Songs LLC (BMI) / ImageM CV / Songs of Zelig (BMI)
 Published by Stephaniesays Music (ASCAP) / Downtown DLJ Songs (ASCAP) by Downtown Music Publishing LLC, Whiteball Music Publishing Group / Downtown DMP Songs (BMI)
 Published by Warner-Barham Music LLC (BMI) / Admin by Songs of Universal (BMI) / Warner-Olive Music LLC (ASCAP)
 Recorded at Greek Theater, EastWest Studios, The Village West (Los Angeles, California)
 Mixed at Electric Lady Studios (New York City)
 Mastered at Sterling Sound Studios (New York City)

Personnel

 Lady Gaga – songwriter, producer, primary vocals
 Bradley Cooper – primary vocals
 Mark Ronson – songwriter
 Anthony Rossomando – songwriter
 Andrew Wyatt – songwriter
 Benjamin Rice – producer, recording
 Bo Bodnar – recording assistant
 Alex Williams – recording assistant
 Tom Elmhirst – mixing
 Brandon Bost – mixing engineer
 Randy Merrill – audio mastering
 Anthony Logerfo – drums
 Corey McCormick – bass
 Alberto Bof – keyboards
 Lukas Nelson – acoustic guitar
 Jesse Siebenberg – lap steel guitar
 Eduardo 'Tato' Melgar – percussion

Charts

Weekly charts

Monthly charts

Year-end charts

Decade-end charts

Garth Brooks and Trisha Yearwood cover

Weekly charts

Year-end charts

Certifications

Release history

See also

 List of best-selling singles
 List of best-selling singles in Australia
 List of most-streamed songs on Spotify
 Artists with the most number-ones on the U.S. Dance Club Songs chart
 List of Billboard Hot 100 top-ten singles in 2018
 List of Billboard Hot 100 number ones of 2019
 List of Canadian Hot 100 number-one singles of 2019
 List of number-one singles of 2018 (Australia)
 List of number-one singles of 2019 (Australia)
 List of number-one hits of 2018 (Austria)
 List of number-one hits of 2019 (Denmark)
 List of number-one singles of 2018 (Ireland)
 List of number-one singles from the 2010s (New Zealand)
 List of number-one songs in Norway
 List of number-one singles of 2018 (Portugal)
 List of number-one singles of the 2010s (Sweden)
 List of number-one hits of 2018 (Switzerland)
 List of Billboard Dance Club Songs number ones of 2018
 List of number-one digital songs of 2018 (U.S.)
 List of number-one digital songs of 2019 (U.S.)
 List of number-one digital songs of 2018 (Canada)
 List of number-one digital songs of 2019 (Canada)
 List of top 10 singles in 2018 (France)
 List of UK Singles Chart number ones of the 2010s
 List of UK Singles Downloads Chart number ones of the 2010s

References

2018 debut singles
2018 songs
2018 singles
2020 singles
2010s ballads
American country music songs
American folk songs
Lady Gaga songs
Bradley Cooper songs
Garth Brooks songs
Trisha Yearwood songs
Billboard Hot 100 number-one singles
Best Original Song Academy Award-winning songs
Best Original Song Golden Globe winning songs
Canadian Hot 100 number-one singles
Country ballads
Folk ballads
Grammy Award for Best Song Written for Visual Media
Grammy Award for Best Pop Duo/Group Performance
Interscope Records singles
Irish Singles Chart number-one singles
Male–female vocal duets
Number-one singles in Australia
Number-one singles in Austria
Number-one singles in the Czech Republic
Number-one singles in Denmark
Number-one singles in Europe
Number-one singles in Hungary
Number-one singles in Iceland
Number-one singles in New Zealand
Number-one singles in Norway
Number-one singles in Portugal
Number-one singles in Scotland
Number-one singles in Sweden
Number-one singles in Switzerland
Pop ballads
Rock ballads
Song recordings produced by Lady Gaga
Songs involved in plagiarism controversies
Songs written by Andrew Wyatt
Songs written by Anthony Rossomando
Songs written by Lady Gaga
Songs written by Mark Ronson
Songs written for films
UK Singles Chart number-one singles
Song recordings produced by Ben Rice (producer)